Macropanax chienii is a species of plant in the family Araliaceae. It is endemic to China.

References

Flora of China
chienii
Vulnerable plants
Taxonomy articles created by Polbot